Dennis Pappas (18 November 1915 – 9 January 1984) was a South African water polo player. He competed in the men's tournament at the 1952 Summer Olympics.

References

1915 births
1984 deaths
South African male water polo players
Olympic water polo players of South Africa
Water polo players at the 1952 Summer Olympics
Place of birth missing